is a Japanese private railway company owned by Hankyu Hanshin Toho Group that links Osaka and Kobe. It also owns the Hanshin Tigers baseball team.

The first character for Kobe (神戸) and the second character for Osaka (大阪) combine to form the company name, 阪神, which can be read Han-shin.

IC cards (PiTaPa and ICOCA) are accepted when taking trains.

Rail lines

Operating lines
Main Line (本線) ( – , 32.1 km)
Hanshin Namba Line (阪神なんば線) ( – , 10.1 km)
The section between Nishikujō and Ōsaka-Namba is the newest line of Hanshin that opened on March 20, 2009. Prior to this extension the line was called the Nishi-Ōsaka Line.
Mukogawa Line (武庫川線) ( – , 1.7 km)
Kobe Kosoku Line (神戸高速線) (Category-2,  – , 5.0 km)
The tracks of the line are owned by Kobe Rapid Transit Railway Co., Ltd. as the Tozai Line.

Abandoned lines
Kita-Osaka Line (北大阪線) ( – )
Kokudo Line (国道線) (Noda – Higashi-Kobe)
Koshien Line (甲子園線) (Kamikoshien -  - Hamakoshien - Nakatsuhama)
Amagasaki Kaigan Line (尼崎海岸線) ( - Higashihama)
Mukogawa Line (武庫川線) (Mukogawa - Muko-ohashi - ): the line between Muko-ohashi and Nishinomiya (JNR) was used only for freight trains operated by JNR.

Incomplete lines
Imazu Deyashiki Line (今津出屋敷線): Takasu - Suzaki - Hamakoshien - Imazu
Amagasaki Takarazuka Line (尼崎宝塚線): Amagasaki - : planned by Takarazuka Amagasaki Railway Company
Daini Hanshin Line: Umeda -  - Amagasaki -  -

History
June 12, 1899:  was established.
July 7, 1899: The company was renamed "Hanshin Electric Railway Co., Ltd."
April 7, 1968: Kobe Rapid Railway was opened and joint operation with Sanyo Electric Railway was started.
February 15, 1998: Joint operation with Sanyo Electric Railway for limited express service between Umeda and Himeji was started.
June 20, 2006: Hankyu Holdings, Inc. completed its purchase of a controlling interest in Hanshin in a transaction valued at about $2.2 billion.
March 20, 2009: Joint operation with Kintetsu Railway for Rapid Express service between Sannomiya and Kintetsu Nara was started.

Rolling stock

Limited Express/Express
1000 series - through services onto the Kintetsu Nara Line
8000 series
9000 series - through services onto the Kintetsu Nara Line
9300 series

Local
5001
5131/5331
5500 series
5550 series (since January 2010)
 5700 series (since August 2015) (2016 Blue Ribbon Award winner)

Mukogawa Line
7861
7890/7990

Subsidiaries 
Hanshin Electric Railway owns the Hanshin Tigers baseball team, whose home ground is Hanshin Koshien Stadium in front of Kōshien Station of the railway's Main Line.

One of the company's subsidiaries is the Osaka-based company Hanshin Contents Link, that operates the Billboard Japan brand under licence from Billboard's publisher.

References

External links 

Hankyu Hanshin Holdings Group Website in English
Hanshin Electric Railway Website in English

 
Companies based in Osaka Prefecture
Railway companies of Japan
Rail transport in Osaka Prefecture
Transport in Kobe
Japanese companies established in 1899
Railway companies established in 1899
Hankyu Hanshin Holdings
2006 mergers and acquisitions